Radini is a village in the Brtonigla municipality in Istria County, Croatia.

References

Populated places in Istria County
Italian-speaking territorial units in Croatia